State Route 416 (SR 416) is a north–south state highway in the east-central portion of Ohio. The southern terminus of State Route 416 is at a T-intersection with U.S. Route 36 just west of Gnadenhutten.

Route description
All of State Route 416 is situated within Tuscarawas County.  No portion of this state highway is included within the National Highway System.

History
As a result of the truncation of State Route 16 to Coshocton in 1969, State Route 416 was created in that year.  Prior to then, State Route 16 ran concurrently with U.S. Route 36 heading east from Coshocton to just west of Gnadenhutten. where it then turned north and followed the entire length of what is now State Route 416 up to and endpoint at then State Route 8, which is now designated State Route 800.  In 1969, State Route 16 was truncated to its current endpoint at U.S. Route 36/State Route 83 in Coshocton.  The portion of what was State Route 16 from U.S. Route 36 near Gnadenhutten to State Route 800 east of Dover was given the designation of State Route 416.  No changes have taken place to the routing of this highway since its debut.

Major intersections

References

External links

 State Route 416 Endpoint Photos

416
Transportation in Tuscarawas County, Ohio